Csákberény is a village in Fejér county, Hungary.

Some outdoor scenes for The Witcher (TV series), particularly the fictional Battle of Marnadal, were filmed in the hills of this village.

References

External links 
The Allure of Lakeside Hungary – The New York Times

Populated places in Fejér County